"The Pool Guy" is the 118th episode of NBC sitcom Seinfeld. This was the eighth episode of the seventh season. It aired on November 16, 1995. The end credit states "In Memory of our Friend Rick Bolden". Rick Bolden was one of the musicians who worked on the show's theme song.

The episode centers on George's fears that he is losing all life independent from his fiancée Susan after she begins fraternizing with his friends. Jerry is uncomfortable at his pool guy's efforts to befriend him, and after getting a new phone number Kramer keeps getting wrong numbers from people trying to call Moviefone.

Plot
Lacking any female friends, Elaine invites Susan to an art exhibit. This upsets George, who fears that his fiancée interacting with his friends will leave him no life apart from Susan. When Jerry also begins spending time with Susan, George becomes increasingly agitated. He eats alone at Reggie's to avoid sitting with Susan and his friends at Monk's.

Kramer's new phone number (555-FILK) is similar to a film information line (555-FILM). When Kramer keeps receiving wrong numbers, he begins posing as Mr. Moviefone, giving out information movie show times from the newspaper.

Jerry meets his pool guy Ramon outside a movie, and then can't get rid of him ever since he got fired from the health club Physique. When passive discouragement fails to work, Jerry flat-out tells Ramon that he doesn't have room in his life for another friend. After Ramon gets his job back, he begins harassing Jerry at Physique. Jerry finally loses his temper when Ramon keeps interrupting his swim exercise using a squeegee pole; he grabs on to the pole and causes Ramon to fall in. Newman runs and dives into the pool, knocking Ramon under. Jerry and Newman are both unwilling to perform mouth-to-mouth resuscitation on the unresponsive Ramon, but other people arrive and save his life. Jerry and Newman's memberships are revoked for their behavior.

Susan, Elaine and Jerry go to a movie, leaving George a note. Partly due to his initially going to the wrong theater, George is unable to find them before the movie is over, and is thrown out by security while ranting about how his friends' association with Susan is "killing independent George". Disgusted by Elaine and Jerry's talking throughout the movie, Susan breaks off her friendship with them.

Kramer is confronted by the real Mr. Moviefone, who says Kramer has been stealing his business. Kramer hides when he threatens to break down the door.

Production
The episode's Jerry plot was considerably altered from writer David Mandel's original concept, in which Jerry and Ramon were shown innocently and mutually developing a friendly acquaintanceship at the health club prior to the downhill slope their relationship takes. Moreover, Mandel wanted Ramon to be a small Hispanic man, intending to find humor in the obvious social mismatch between Jerry and Ramon. Watching a video of playwright/performing artist Danny Hoch, he was impressed with how Hoch did 15 different Hispanic voices; Hoch was cast as Ramon and did the table read for the episode. However, Hoch eventually objected to what he felt was ethnic stereotyping in the way his character was written, and the part was recast. Carlos Jacott gave a more mentally unhinged portrayal of Ramon than was originally planned, so the Seinfeld crew decided to focus on that and drop the Hispanic angle. Hoch later incorporated his experience with Seinfeld into his act.

The pool scene was filmed at the YMCA in Hollywood. Wayne Knight was uncomfortable at the prospect of wearing a bathing suit for the scene due to the level of bodily exposure, so the crew came up with the idea of him wearing a modest, comically archaic swimming outfit. The idea of Jerry and Newman being unwilling to give Ramon mouth-to-mouth resuscitation was contributed by Seinfeld creators Larry David and Jerry Seinfeld.

The footage of the fictional movie "Chunnel" was taken from The American President. George's line while the movie plays behind him, "I know you're in there laughing at me, laughing and lying!" was taken from the girlfriend of one of David Mandel's friends; she shouted the line outside a building during a drunken rant. The scene at Reggie's is actually stock footage from the episode "The Soup".

Mr. Moviefone was voiced by Russ Leatherman, the real Mr. Moviefone; Leatherman was unable to be present for the filming, so the brief shot of his body is another actor.

Reception
The episode won 'Best Episodic Comedy' at the Writers Guild of America Awards 1996.

References

External links
 

Seinfeld (season 7) episodes
1995 American television episodes
Television episodes written by David Mandel